Neha Shitole is an Indian actress who works predominantly in Marathi and Hindi television and Films. She was a contestant of Bigg Boss Marathi 2.

Career 
She made her acting debut with film Deool in 2011. Since then, she acted in various Marathi films such as Popat, Sur Sapata, Disha,  Readymix, Poshter Girl. She has also acted in many television series such as Tu Tithe Me, Kunku, Fu Bai Fu, Ka Re Durava. She appeared in Sacred Games - Netflix as Shalini Katekar. In 2019, she participated in Bigg Boss Marathi 2 and become runner up. She also featured in Marathi play Bye Bye Bayko in 2018.

Filmography

References

External links 
 

Living people
Actresses in Marathi television
Actresses in Marathi cinema
Bigg Boss Marathi contestants
Year of birth missing (living people)
Actresses from Pune